Jessica Motaung (born August 23, 1973) is a South African television personality, sports executive and former beauty pageant winner. As of February 2021 she serves as Marketing Director of the Kaizer Chiefs Football Club (known popularly by the Zulu-language phrase Amakhosi, which means "chiefs") in the Naturena suburb of Johannesburg, South Africa. She has held that position since 2003.

Motaung was named second runner-up as the representative for South Africa at the 1997 Miss World pageant. The same year, she was named Miss South Africa First Princess and Africa's Queen of Beauty. In 1998 she was the presenter of Speak Out, an investigative news programme produced by the South African Broadcasting Corporation.

Motaung is the daughter of South African football legend and founder of Amakhosi, Kaizer Motaung.

Awards

 Miss Gauteng (1997)
 Women's Day Awards, seven most influential women in South Africa. (2014)
 Top Ten, South Africa's most influential women (2015) 
 Nominee, Spar GSport Woman of the Year (2015)
 Honoured by Protea Glen Secondary School as one of South Africa's most influential women (2020)

References 

1973 births
Kaizer Chiefs F.C.
Miss World 1997 delegates
South African women
Living people